The 5000 metres or 5000-metre run is a common long-distance running event in track and field, approximately equivalent to  or . It is one of the track events in the Olympic Games and the World Championships in Athletics, run over  laps of a standard track. The same distance in road running is called a 5K run; referring to the distance in metres rather than kilometres serves to disambiguate the two events.
The 5000 m has been present on the Olympic programme since 1912 for men and since 1996 for women. Prior to 1996, women had competed in an Olympic 3000 metres race since 1984. The 5000 m has been held at each of the World Championships in Athletics in men's competition and since 1995 in women's.

The event is almost the same length as the dolichos race held at the Ancient Olympic Games, introduced in 720 BCE. World Athletics keeps official records for both outdoor and indoor 5000-metre track events.

3 miles
The 5000 metres is the (slightly longer) approximate metric equivalent of the  run, an event common in countries which used the imperial measurement system. The 3-mile event featured in the Commonwealth Games through 1966, and was a championship in the United States in non-Olympic years from 1953 to 1973. It required 12 laps around a  track.

All-time top 25

Men
Correct as of September 2022.

Women
Correct as of June 2022.

All-time indoor top 10

Men 
Correct as of February 2023.

Women 
Correct as of February 2023.

Olympic medalists

Men

Two men have won the Olympic 5000 metres on two occasions, both times back-to-back. Lasse Virén of Finland was the first to achieve the feat, winning the title in 1972 in Munich, before retaining the title in 1976 in Montreal. Mo Farah of Great Britain matched the achievement, winning the title in 2012 in London, and retaining it four years later in Rio de Janeiro. Both men achieved 5000 metre - 10,000 metre doubles on both occasions.

Finnish legend Paavo Nurmi is the only male runner to have won three Olympic medals at the distance, a gold and two silvers between 1920 and 1928.

Women

Only one woman has won the Olympic 5000 metres title twice, Ethiopian Meseret Defar winning in Athens in 2004, taking silver behind compatriot Tirunesh Dibaba in 2008, before regaining the title in London in 2012. Defar and Dibaba are the only athletes with three Olympic medals at the distance, with both reaching the podium in 2004, 2008 and 2012.

World Championships Medalists

Men

In the World Championships, Great Britain's Mo Farah stands alone, the most successful and most decorated athlete in the event with three gold medals (2011, 2013 and 2015) and four medals in total (including silver in 2017) between 2011 and 2017. Kenya's Ismael Kirui was the first athlete to win the title twice in 1993 and 1995, and Ethiopia's Muktar Edris the third between 2017 and 2019.

Women

Romania's Gabriela Szabo won the title twice between 1995 and 1997. Since then four African runners - two Kenyan, two Ethiopian  - have repeated the feat; Tirunesh Dibaba and Meseret Defar of Ethiopia and Vivian Cheruiyot and Hellen Obiri of Kenya. Meseret Defar's five medals  - 2 gold, a silver and two bronze won between 2005 and 2013 - are the most won in the event by any athlete.

Season's bests

Men

Women

See also

 National champions 5000 metres (men)
 National champions 5000 metres (women)

References

External links
IAAF list of 5000-metres records in XML
ARRS: Yearly Rankings – 5000 metres Outdoor Track
All-time Masters men's 5000 m list 
All-time Masters women's 5000 m list 

 
Events in track and field
Long-distance running distances
Summer Olympic disciplines in athletics